The 1978–79 Bradford City A.F.C. season was the 66th in the club's history.

The club finished 15th in Division Four, reached the 2nd round of the FA Cup, and the 2nd round of the League Cup.

Sources

References

Bradford City A.F.C. seasons
Bradford City